James Nathaniel Chamblee (born May 6, 1975 in Denton, Texas) is a former Major League Baseball player.

External links

1975 births
Living people
Major League Baseball third basemen
Cincinnati Reds players
Baseball players from Texas
Sportspeople from Denton, Texas